The men's 50 metre freestyle S4 event at the 2012 Paralympic Games took place on 31 August, at the London Aquatics Centre.

Two heats were held, one with seven competitors, the other with eight. The swimmers with the eight fastest times advanced to the final.

Heats

Heat 1

Heat 2

Final

External links
 Men's 50m Freestyle S4 at London Olympics 

Swimming at the 2012 Summer Paralympics